The USCGC Lilac (WAGL/WLM-227) is a former Coast Guard lighthouse tender located in New York City. The Lilac is America's only surviving steam-powered lighthouse tender. It was built in 1933 at the Pusey & Jones Shipyard in Wilmington, Delaware.  In the 1950s she assisted several ships that collided.  Decommissioned in 1972, she was donated to the Harry Lundeburg Seamanship School of Seafarers International Union. She  was added to the National Register of Historic Places on January 7, 2005.  She is a museum ship, docked at Pier 25, near North Moore Street in Manhattan. In 2016, she appeared in two episodes of the Netflix series, Daredevil.

References

External links
Lilac Preservation Project

Ships on the National Register of Historic Places in Manhattan
1933 ships
Ships of the United States Coast Guard
Museum ships in New York (state)